Maquehue Airport  is an airport  southwest of Temuco, a city in the La Araucanía Region of Chile.

Runway 06 has a  displaced threshold.

This airport is now closed to the public and commercial flights have been relocated to La Araucanía International Airport.

See also
Transport in Chile
List of airports in Chile

References

External links
OpenStreetMap - Maquehue
OurAirports - Maquehue
SkyVector - Maquehue
Aeródromo Maquehue (SCTC) at Aerodromo.cl

Airports in Chile
Airports in La Araucanía Region